Mount Vernon is a suburb in the south of Durban, KwaZulu-Natal, South Africa.

References

Suburbs of Durban